Rosemarie Wenner (born July 1, 1955) is a German Methodist bishop. She was the Presiding Bishop of the United Methodist Church in Germany from April 2005 until May 2017.

Rosemarie Wenner studied in Reutlingen, Germany. After her ordination she worked in Karlsruhe-Durlach, Hockenheim and Darmstadt/Sprendlingen.

On April 1, 2005 Rosemarie Wenner was the first woman to be elected United Methodist bishop in Germany. She succeeded Dr. Walter Klaiber. 

From 2012 to 2014 she was the president of the UMC Council of Bishops. She was the first woman from outside the United States to preside over the council.

Rosemarie Wenner is a member of the UMC Commission on a Way Forward that was tasked by the General Conference find a solution for the conflict on the disputed paragraphs in the UMC's Book of Discipline regarding homosexuality.

See also

List of bishops of the United Methodist Church

References

InfoServ, the official information service of The United Methodist Church.  
The Council of Bishops of the United Methodist Church

External links 
 http://www.emk.de (German)

1955 births
Living people
German United Methodist bishops
Women Methodist bishops
21st-century Methodist ministers
20th-century Methodist ministers